Chally is an alternate spelling for:

 Çallı, Zardab, a village in Azerbaijan
 Challis (fabric), a type of fabric
 Challenger 1, a British tank in service from the mid-1980s to early 21st century
 Challenger 2, a British tank in service since 1998